Green Hell is a 2019 survival video game by Creepy Jar. The game takes place in the Amazon rainforest and was released for Windows, Nintendo Switch, PlayStation 4, and Xbox One.

Gameplay 
The game is played in first-person perspective in single player mode or in coop multiplayer. It is an open world simulation in which the player has to ensure their survival by collecting raw materials and food. However, the character, Jake, cannot rely on the accumulation of these essentials alone. Players also need to craft shelter and weapons with the materials they have collected. The player begins in a lone jungle camp without any further context. Throughout the game, dynamic changes occur within the environment, which influences the physical and psychological state of the character, e.g. in the form of hallucinations. Furthermore, the player must maintain a balanced diet with the help of a smartwatch. The smartwatch provides an insight of the nutrients that the character lacks by alerting the player through the player's health. The player must sleep enough and must maintain their health, e.g. by avoiding contact with poisonous animals or unsavory food and by avoiding injuries. The player can make medicine and bandages, which allow them to restore health. Infected wounds can be treated by putting maggots in the wound and bandaging it once the maggots have cleared away the dead flesh. A compass and GPS serve as navigation aids.

In the optional story mode, the player follows a frame story that revolves around the search for their missing wife.

A prequel to the original release, titled Spirits of Amazonia Part 1, was released on January 28, 2021. Spirits of Amazonia Part 2 released on June 22, 2021. Both offer single-player and co-op game play.

Story 

The story revolves around anthropologist named Jake Higgins, who wakes up in the jungle on the edge of the Amazon River. He tries to familiarize himself with the surroundings to ensure his survival and to find his wife Mia who went missing after going on a solo trip to the nearby tribal village. She is a linguist and wants to make the first contact with the indigenous people Yabahuaca. The story is told from the first-person perspective by Jake, who notices that his wife is in danger. His only connection to her is through a radio.

Throughout his journey, Jake, as well as the natural dangers in the jungle, encounters a skull-painted splinter faction of the Yabahuaca, the Waraha, who are composed of members of the original tribe who decided to resort to violence against the researchers.

Reception 

The title was well received by critics. On Metacritic it holds an approval rating of 78/100, based on 13 reviews. On 24 June 2020, Creepy Jar announced that the game sold over 1 million copies.

Nominations 
The game was nominated for Central & Eastern European Game Awards 2019 in the categories Best Game and Best Design.

Notes

References

External links
 
 Green Hell at MobyGames

2019 video games
Early access video games
Multiplayer and single-player video games
Nintendo Switch games
PlayStation 4 games
Survival video games
Video games developed in Poland
Video games set in forests
Video games set in South America
Windows games
Works about missing people
Xbox One games